Wilfried Gröbner (born 18 December 1949) is a German former footballer and coach who was part of East Germany's gold medal-winning team at the 1976 Olympics.

Club career 
The defender played 230 East German top-flight matches for Lokomotive Leipzig.

International career 
Between 1976 and 1979 he was part of the East Germany national team. His only appearance for the East Germany Olympic team, during this era still counted as a full international when it was played against another A squad (in this case Poland), was in 1976 the Gold Medal match at the Montreal Olympics. East German won this encounter against Poland 3-1 and became Olympic champion.

Coaching career 
Gröbner later was at the coaching helm for Rot-Weiß Erfurt and SSV Reutlingen.

References

External links

1949 births
Living people
People from Eilenburg
German footballers
East German footballers
East Germany international footballers
Footballers from Saxony
Association football defenders
1. FC Lokomotive Leipzig players
East German football managers
German football managers
FC Rot-Weiß Erfurt managers
DDR-Oberliga players
Olympic footballers of East Germany
Olympic medalists in football
Olympic gold medalists for East Germany
Footballers at the 1976 Summer Olympics
Medalists at the 1976 Summer Olympics
Recipients of the Patriotic Order of Merit in bronze